Alexander John Doull was an Anglican bishop in the 20th century.

Doull was educated at Merchiston Castle School and Oriel College, Oxford. He trained for Holy Orders at Ripon College Cuddesdon.

Doull was ordained in the Church of England in 1896. He began his career with curacies at Leeds Parish Church and  the  Church of the Advent, Montreal, of which he was later Rector. From 1910 to 1914 he was Dean of Columbia at Christ Church Cathedral, Victoria until his appointment to the episcopate as the inaugural Bishop of Kootenay. He resigned his See in 1933 to become Archdeacon of Sheffield, but illness forced a return to British Columbia where he died on 15 February 1937.

References

{{S-ttltitle=Bishop of Kootenay|years=1915–1933}}

1870 births
1937 deaths
People educated at Merchiston Castle School
Alumni of Oriel College, Oxford
Alumni of Ripon College Cuddesdon
20th-century Anglican Church of Canada bishops
Archdeacons of Sheffield
Anglican bishops of Kootenay